The Pirate is a 1973 Hong Kong action martial arts film directed by Chang Cheh, Pao Huseh-li and Wu Ma. The film is based on the life of 19th-century pirate Cheung Po Tsai, who is portrayed by Ti Lung.

Plot synopsis
Pirate Cheung Po Tsai sails to a shoreline southern China disguised as a rich trader. There, the villagers live in poverty due to struggle against exploitation and corruption by the government. At the same time, Cheung attracts the attention of merchant Xiang You-lin (Tin Ching) and his sister, who are keen on killing him for a bounty offered on Cheung. Cheung then agrees to expedite funds to them in the form of cash and goods stolen from foreign invading colonists. While still on land, Cheung discovers that one of his former crew member Hua Er-dao (Fan Mei-sheng), who is an escaped convict, has captured his ship, goods and his crew. As Hua determines to seek vengeance on him, Cheung flees and seeks refuge in a casino.

The admiral of the  Qing imperial court sends young general Wu Yee (David Chiang) to investigate where pirates are hiding and ultimately finds Cheung. As the two encounter each other, each of them display their skills in duel while also appreciating each other. Wu eventually grows respect for Cheung for his righteous nature and begins to question his own conscience. He decides to let Cheung escape the government forces tracking him, facilitating Cheung a boat. Cheung promises Wu Yee that they will meet again and finish their fight on their next encounter.

Cast
Ti Lung as Cheung Po Tsai
David Chiang as General Wu Yee
Tin Ching as Xiang You-lin
Dean Shek as Master Bai
Yuen Man-tzu as Hai Tang
Fan Mei-shang as Hua Er-dao
Yue Fung as 2nd Miss
Lau Gong as Zeng Guo-xiong
Bruce Tong as Ma Ping
Wu Chi-chin as corrupt policeman
Yeung Chak-lam as corrupt policeman
Lo Dik as Leader at the ship docks
Wang Kuang-yu as secret agent
Cheng Keng-yeh as secret agent
Ko Hung as Xiao Bao
Wong Ching-ho as Desperate fisherman
Liu Wai as Brothel Boss
Shum Lo as Casino clerk
Chui Fat as Pirate
Lee Yung-kit as Pirate who gambles in casino
Leung Seung-wan as Master Shing
Tung Choi-bo as Casino Guard
Tino Wong as thug
Lau Chun-fai as thug
Yuen Shun-yi as Pirate
Lee Chiu as Pirate

Critical reception
James Mudge of Beyond Hollywood gave the film a positive review and writes "Well made and featuring charismatic turns from two of the studio’s biggest stars, it should appeal not only to Shaw Brothers aficionados, but to all fans of the pirate film." Matthew Le-feuvre of City on Fire rated the film 8 stars out of 10 and writes "the defining novelty of both Ti Lung and David Chiang spearheading their eighteenth collaboration for an indelible saga of obligation, revenge and misguided loyalties, is itself a landmark achievement even by Hollywood conventions."

References

External links

The Pirate at Hong Kong Cinemagic

1973 films
1970s action adventure films
1973 martial arts films
Hong Kong action adventure films
Hong Kong martial arts films
Pirate films
Kung fu films
1970s Mandarin-language films
Films directed by Chang Cheh
Films directed by Wu Ma
Shaw Brothers Studio films
Films set in 19th-century Qing dynasty
Films set in Hong Kong
Films shot in Hong Kong
1970s Hong Kong films